Kinsella Peak is a peak along the south side of Gale Ridge,  west of Mount Cowart, in the Neptune Range of the Pensacola Mountains, Antarctica. It was mapped by the United States Geological Survey from surveys and U.S. Navy air photos from 1956 to 1966, and was named by the Advisory Committee on Antarctic Names for William R. Kinsella, an electronics technician at Ellsworth Station during the winter of 1958.

References

Mountains of Queen Elizabeth Land
Pensacola Mountains